Andahuaylas (Quechua Antawaylla, anta copper, waylla meadow, "copper meadow") is a Peruvian city. It is the capital of the Andahuaylas Province in the Apurímac Region. It is known as the pradera de los celajes (Spanish for "prairie of colored clouds"). Its approximate population of 42,268 inhabitants (2017 census) makes it the first largest city in the region.

Geography

Andahuyalas is located in the western part of the Apurímac Region. The nearest city is Abancay.

Transportation
Andahuaylas is served by its own airport, the Andahuaylas Airport.

Gallery

See also 
 Suyt'uqucha
 Andahuaylazo

References

External links
Pukllay, El verdadero carnaval originario de Perú. (www.pukllay.pe)

Andahuaylas.net Andahuaylas' web site
Municipalidad Andahuaylas
Andahuaylas.com (under construction)

Journal of Andahuaylas
Diario Opinión
 

Populated places in the Apurímac Region